Gettman is a surname. Notable people with the surname include:

Jake Gettman (1875–1956), Russian-born American baseball player
Jon Gettman (born 1957), American cannabis activist
Virginia Leslie Gettman (1922–2011), American actress known professionally as Leslie Brooks